Michal Plocek (born 17 April 1994 in Uherské Hradiště; dead 28 November 2016 in Prague) was a Czech rower.

He won the gold medal at the 2012 World Rowing Junior Championships.
He participated at 2015 World Rowing Championships.

References

External links

World Rowing

1994 births
2016 deaths
Czech male rowers